Harry Stephen Patrick Child (born Harry Stephen Patrick Chesley) (May 23, 1905 – November 8, 1972) was an American professional baseball player who played one season in the Major Leagues. He attended Loyola University Maryland.

Child's pro career lasted three seasons, beginning in 1928. In his 1930 stint with Washington, he pitched exclusively in relief and allowed seven hits, seven earned runs, and five bases on balls in ten full innings pitched. He recorded five strikeouts.

Child died at the age of 67 in Alexandria, Virginia.

External links

1905 births
1972 deaths
Baseball players from Baltimore
Los Angeles Angels (minor league) players
Loyola Greyhounds baseball players
Major League Baseball pitchers
Washington Senators (1901–1960) players